Camarona is a genus of bristle flies in the family Tachinidae. There are at least two described species in Camarona.

Species
Camarona caeruleonigra Wulp, 1891
Camarona xanthogastra Wulp, 1891

References

Dexiinae
Taxa named by Frederik Maurits van der Wulp
Tachinidae genera
Diptera of South America